Big Boss is a 1995 Indian Telugu-language film directed by Vijaya Bapineedu. The film stars Chiranjeevi, Roja, Kota Srinivasa Rao and Madhavi in important roles. The film was also dubbed and released in Malayalam under the same title.

Plot 

The movie starts with a young man Surendra (Chiranjeevi) landing in a town for a job. He witnesses rivalry between two mafia gangs at that place. After a fight with a street goon, he is recognized by one gang and encouraged to become a don. He rents a room in Madhavi's house, who lives with her sister Roja and granny (Nirmalamma). After few routine scenes, Roja falls in love with Surendra and expresses her love. But Bavaraju Surendra becomes uncertain about his future, rejects Roja's proposal and starts looking for matches for her. Meanwhile, his mother (Sujatha), younger brother, and sister move to his place and start living with him. His mother worries about his lifestyle and his future. One day, she recognizes Kota Srinivasa Rao, the rival gang leader as the destroyer of her family. Surendra's family is kidnapped by Kota and how Surendra rescues them forms the climax of this movie.

Cast 
 Chiranjeevi as Bavarala Surendra / Boss
 Roja as Roja
 Kota Srinivasa Rao as Varadarajulu
 Vijayachander as Akkineedu
 Madhavi
 Ali
 Nirmalamma as Roja's grandmother
 Allu Rama Lingaiah as Kukkalakunta Subbarao
 Babu Mohan
 Narra Venkateswara Rao
 Sujatha as Surendra's mother
 Tanikella Bharani as SI Yadagiri

Soundtrack 
 "Mava Mava": S. P. Balasubrahmanyam, K. S. Chitra
 "Koosethesinnade": S. P. Balasubrahmanyam, Renuka
 "Uromochesindoy": S. P. Balasubrahmanyam, K. S. Chitra
 "Nee Lanti Revulona": S. P. Balasubrahmanyam, K. S. Chitra
 "Number 1 Number 2": S. P. Balasubrahmanyam
 "Sudiki Daram": Mano, K. S. Chitra

References

External links 

1995 films
1990s Telugu-language films